Cochleoceps bicolor, the western cleaner clingfish, is a species of clingfish from the family Gobiesocidae which is endemic to southern Australia. This species has a ground colouration which varies from yellowish to reddish marked with regular transverse blue bands along its back and a bluish-grey caudal fin. This species occurs on rocky reefs and jetty or pier  piles, where they establish cleaning stations, often over sponges and ascidians, but are known to use a wide variety of reef related  sites as stations, perhaps the most important criterion being the prominent visibility  of a site to passing parasite laden clients .A station may have from one to multiple Western Cleaner Clingfish, depending on the demand for services and other factors. Some divers have observed shared stations, where several other known temperate marine cleaner host species-notably juvenile moonlighter fish (Tilodon sexfasciatus) and rockpool shrimp (Palaemon serenus) - behave in cooperative fashion, possibly when client demand peaks, tide and season depending.   They are thought to feed on parasites which they clean off larger fish. The distribution of this species extends from Lancelin, Western Australia to Port Phillip in Victoria. C. bicolor was described in 1991 by Barry Hutchins from a type locality of Flinders Island.

References

Fish described in 1991
bicolor